The 2010–11 season was JS Kabylie's 41st season in the Algerian Ligue Professionnelle 1. They competed in Ligue 1, the 2010 CAF Champions League and the Algerian Cup.

Squad list
Players and squad numbers last updated on 18 November 2010.Note: Flags indicate national team as has been defined under FIFA eligibility rules. Players may hold more than one non-FIFA nationality.

Manager
Swiss manager Alain Geiger began the season as the manager, continuing in his position from the previous season, after leading the team to an impressive record over the summer in the group stage of the 2010 CAF Champions League with 4 wins and 2 draws. However, after losing in the semi-finals of the Champions League to TP Mazembe of DR Congo and a string of bad results in the league, he resigned from his position on December 13, 2010, with JS Kabylie sitting in 8th position in the standings. On December 22, 2010, Rachid Belhout was appointed manager of the team.

Managerial changes

Pre-season and friendlies

Competitions

Overview

{| class="wikitable" style="text-align: center"
|-
!rowspan=2|Competition
!colspan=8|Record
!rowspan=2|Started round
!rowspan=2|Final position / round
!rowspan=2|First match	
!rowspan=2|Last match
|-
!
!
!
!
!
!
!
!
|-
| Ligue 1

|  
| 11th
| 25 September 2010
| 8 July 2011
|-
| Algerian Cup

| Round of 64 
| style="background:gold;"|Winner
| 29 December 2010
| 1 May 2011
|-
| Champions League

| Group stage
| Semi-finals
| 18 July 2010
| 17 October 2010
|-
| Confederation Cup

| First round
| Play-off round
| 20 March 2011
| 10 June 2011
|-
! Total

Ligue 1

League table

Results summary

Results by round

Matches

Algerian Cup

Champions League

Group stage

Group B

Semi-finals

CAF Confederation Cup

First round

Second round

Play-off for group stage

Squad information

Playing statistics

|-

|-
! colspan=14 style=background:#dcdcdc; text-align:center| Players transferred out during the season

Goalscorers
Includes all competitive matches. The list is sorted alphabetically by surname when total goals are equal.

Transfers

In

Out

References

JS Kabylie seasons
JS Kabylie